Khvalynsk is a river port town in Saratov Oblast, Russia, located by the Volga River. Population:    16,000 (1974).

The place name stems from the old Russian name of the Caspian Sea: Хвалынское море, or "Khvalyn Sea". The latter is derived from the name "Khwalis" for the inhabitants of Khwarezm. The town is the namesake of the Khvalynsk Hills and Khvalynsk culture.

History

It was founded in 1556 as a Russian outpost on the Sosnovy Island on the Volga. In 1606, the whole settlement was relocated to the spot of today's Khvalynsk and came to be known as Sosnovy Ostrov (lit. pine island). In 1780, the settlement was granted uyezd town status and renamed Khvalynsk.

In the 18th–19th centuries, Khvalynsk was known as a local center for trading bread and agricultural produce. It was also one of the centers of the Old Believers. Some scholars believe that Khvalynsk was used by Nikolai Gogol as a setting for his play The Government Inspector.

Administrative and municipal status
Within the framework of administrative divisions, Khvalynsk serves as the administrative center of Khvalynsky District, even though it is not a part of it. As an administrative division, it is, together with four rural localities, incorporated separately as Khvalynsk Town Under Oblast Jurisdiction—an administrative unit with the status equal to that of the districts. As a municipal division, Khvalynsk Town Under Oblast Jurisdiction, together with two rural localities in Khvalynsky District, is incorporated within Khvalynsky Municipal District as Khvalynsk Urban Settlement.

Notable people and culture
Khvalynsk is the birthplace of the artist Kuzma Petrov-Vodkin, whose museum was established in the town in 1995.

References

Notes

Other sources

External links

Official website of Khvalynsk 

Cities and towns in Saratov Oblast
Khvalynsky Uyezd
Populated places on the Volga
Populated places established in 1556
1556 establishments in Russia